July Days is the 16th Our Gang short subject comedy released. The Our Gang series (later known as "The Little Rascals") was created by Hal Roach in 1922, and continued production until 1944.

Plot
A new family moves into town. Mickey immediately falls in love with the family's daughter, Mary, and tries whatever he can to gain her affections. He tries taking her for a ride on his goat-powered wagon, and later dresses up as a knight. In the interim, the village blacksmith, "Dad" Anderson, receives a lucrative contract to produce a creation of his: a sail-propelled scooter. The gang is lucky enough to get a hold of a few of these scooters, and happily sail down the city streets.

Production notes
In July Days, Mary and Jackie are siblings while Jack is the neighborhood bully.

When the television rights for the original silent Pathé Exchange Our Gang comedies were sold to National Telepix and other distributors, several episodes were retitled. This film was released into TV syndication as Mischief Makers in 1960 under the title Puppy Love. Two-thirds of the original film was included.

Cast

The Gang
 Joe Cobb as Joe
 Jackie Condon as Jackie
 Mickey Daniels as Mickey
 Jack Davis as Jack
 Allen Hoskins as Farina
 Mary Kornman as Mary
 Ernie Morrison as Ernie
 Dinah the Mule as Herself

Additional cast
 Julia Brown as Girl with freckles
 Richard Daniels as Dad Anderson
 William Gillespie as Businessman
 Leona Levin as Playmate of bullied girl

External links 
 
 

1923 films
1923 comedy films
Hal Roach Studios short films
American silent short films
American black-and-white films
Films directed by Robert F. McGowan
Our Gang films
1923 short films
1920s American films
Silent American comedy films